A regional election took place in the region of Pays de la Loire on March 21 and March 28, 2004, along with all other regions. Jacques Auxiette (PS) was elected President of the Council.

Results

References 

Pays de la Loire regional election
Elections in Pays de la Loire